The 2014–15 East Superleague (known as the McBookie.com East Superleague for sponsorship reasons) was the 13th season of the East Superleague, the top tier of league competition for SJFA East Region member clubs.

The season began on 6 August 2014 and ended on 3 June 2015. Bo'ness United were the reigning champions.

Ballingry Rovers folded on 25 November 2014 and withdrew from the league with immediate effect. Their playing record was expunged.

Kelty Hearts won their first East Superleague title on 13 May 2015. As champions they entered the preliminary round of the 2015–16 Scottish Cup.

Teams
The following teams changed division after the 2013–14 season.

To East Superleague
Promoted from East Premier League
Penicuik Athletic
Fauldhouse United

From East Superleague
Relegated to East Premier League
St Andrews United
Tayport

Stadia and locations

Managerial changes

League table

Results

East Region Super/Premier League play-off
Broughty Athletic, who finished third in the East Premier League, defeated Armadale Thistle on penalty kicks after drawing 5–5 on aggregate in the East Region Super/Premier League play-off to gain promotion.

References

6
East Superleague seasons